Afek Tounes ("Tunisian Aspiration(s)" or "Horizons of Tunisia") is a centre-right political party in Tunisia. Its program is liberal, focusing on secularism and civil liberties. The party mainly appealed to intellectuals and the upper class.

Moncef Marzouki accused the party of having ties to the now banned Constitutional Democratic Rally. The party took offense to his statements and considered his accusation to be "inappropriate" and, according to Al Maghreb, sued him for "deficiency of professional ethics."

Afek Tounes won 4 seats for the constitutive assembly. The party was rattled on 3 November 2011 though by the resignation of several key founding members such as its spokesperson Emna Mnif, its general secretary Mustapha Mezghani, Sami Zaoui, Hela Hababou and another 13 members.

After underperforming in the 2011 Constituent Assembly election, Afek Tounes joined talks with other secularist and liberal parties, especially the Progressive Democratic Party to form a "big party of the centre". The merger was completed on 9 April 2012. The new party is called the Republican Party.

In August 2013, Yassine Brahim and other former party members left the Republican Party to revive Afek Tounes.

On 19 December 2020, Fadhel Abdelkefi was elected president by the national council for a 4 year term.

In March 2021, the party cofounds the Al Hurriya Liberal Network.

Election results

External links
 Official Website

References

2011 establishments in Tunisia
Liberal parties in Tunisia
Political parties established in 2011
Secularism in Tunisia